The National Party of Greece was a  political party founded by the Greek General Napoleon Zervas in 1946.

The party ran in the 1946 Greek legislative election and elected 25 MPs. It participated in the government of Dimitrios Maximos and Napoleon Zervas served as Minister for Public Order. In the 1950 Greek legislative election the party gained 3,65% and elected 7 MPs. After the elections of 1950 the party merged into Liberal Party.

Conservative parties in Greece
Defunct political parties in Greece
1946 establishments in Greece
Eastern Orthodox political parties